Alfons Niklas (born 20 January 1929) is a Polish athlete. He competed in the men's hammer throw at the 1956 Summer Olympics.

References

1929 births
Living people
Athletes (track and field) at the 1956 Summer Olympics
Polish male hammer throwers
Olympic athletes of Poland
People from Chojnice County
Sportspeople from Pomeranian Voivodeship
Zawisza Bydgoszcz athletes